The 1944–45 Boston Bruins season was the Bruins' 21st season in the NHL.

Offseason

Regular season

Final standings

Record vs. opponents

Schedule and results

Playoffs
The Detroit Red Wings finished second in the league with 67 points. The Boston Bruins finished fourth with 36 points. This was the fourth playoff meeting between these two teams with Detroit winning the two of the three previous series. They last met in the 1943 Stanley Cup Finals where the Red Wings won in four games. Detroit won this season's ten-game regular-season series earning nineteen of twenty points.

Player statistics

Regular season
Scoring

Goaltending

Playoffs
Scoring

Goaltending

Awards and records

Transactions

See also
1944–45 NHL season

References

Boston Bruins
Boston Bruins
Boston Bruins seasons
Boston
Boston
1940s in Boston